Nechtan of Aberdeen is the first Bishop of Aberdeen after the seat of the bishopric had been moved to Aberdeen from Mortlach. The only contemporary sources for Bishop Nechtan are charters; he appears as "Nectan escob Abberdeon" in a Gaelic charter recorded in the notitiae on the Book of Deer, a charter which explicitly dates to "the eighth year of the reign of David", that is, 1131. He also appears in a charter granted to him by King David I of Scotland, a charter which the modern editor dates to 1137.

Later Medieval authorities make specific claims about dates. Hector Boece, for instance, wrote that Nechtan became bishop in 1122, and that Nechtan ruled Mortlach for 14 years, and a further 17 years at Aberdeen. Moreover, Gavin Dunbar, a 16th-century Archbishop of Glasgow, wrote in his Epistolare that Nechtan's see was moved from Mortlach to Aberdeen in the year 1125, partially contradicting the account of Boece. Neither source is particularly reliable.

Notes

References
Dowden, John, The Bishops of Scotland, ed. J. Maitland Thomson, (Glasgow, 1912)
Jackson, Kenneth H. (ed), The Gaelic Notes in the Book of Deer (The Osborn Bergin Memorial Lecture 1970), (Cambridge, 1972)
Lawrie, Sir Archibald, Early Scottish Charters Prior to A.D. 1153, (Glasgow, 1905)

11th-century births
12th-century deaths
Bishops of Aberdeen
Medieval Gaels from Scotland
12th-century Scottish Roman Catholic bishops